The 1920 Yukon general election was held on February 25, 1920 to elect the three members of the Yukon Territorial Council. The number of councilors was reduced from ten in the previous election to three following the general decline in population since the Klondike Gold Rush. The council held an advisory role to the federally appointed Commissioner.

Members elected

References

1920
1920 elections in Canada
Election
February 1920 events